Maulette is a commune within the Yvelines department in Île-de-France region, France.

See also
Communes of the Yvelines department

References

Communes of Yvelines